Korea women's national football team may refer to:

 North Korea women's national football team, the association football team representing North Korea
 South Korea women's national football team, the association football team representing South Korea